"Wild Honey Pie" is a song by the English rock band the Beatles from their 1968 double album The Beatles (also known as the "White Album"). It was written by Paul McCartney and credited to Lennon–McCartney. Less than a minute in length, the song mainly consists of the title being chanted repeatedly and was performed by McCartney without the participation of the other Beatles. The track is often viewed as a filler track and is generally regarded as inconsequential and unmemorable due to its experimental nature.

Recording
"Wild Honey Pie" was recorded on 20 August 1968 at the end of the recording session for "Mother Nature's Son". Like "Mother Nature's Son", McCartney is the sole member of the Beatles heard on the recording. At the time, John Lennon and Ringo Starr were working on other White Album songs, and George Harrison was on holiday in Greece. McCartney also recorded the unreleased song "Etcetera" during this session.

McCartney said of this song: "We were in an experimental mode, and so I said, 'Can I just make something up?' I started off with the guitar and did a multitracking experiment in the control room or maybe in the little room next door. It was very home-made; it wasn't a big production at all. I just made up this short piece and I multitracked a harmony to that, and a harmony to that, and a harmony to that, and built it up sculpturally with a lot of vibrato on the [guitar] strings, really pulling the strings madly. Hence, 'Wild Honey Pie', which was a reference to the other song I had written called 'Honey Pie'."

Release and reception
"Wild Honey Pie" was sequenced between "Ob-La-Di, Ob-La-Da" and "The Continuing Story of Bungalow Bill", on side one of "the White Album". According to McCartney, the song might have been excluded but Harrison's wife, Pattie Boyd, "liked it very much so we decided to leave it on the album".

In his book on the White Album, David Quantick describes "Wild Honey Pie" as a "genuinely inferior" piece that, after Lennon's avant-garde "Revolution 9", is among the tracks that are most commonly omitted from listeners' single-album versions of the Beatles' 1968 double LP. Author Mark Hertsgaard, referring to Lennon's distaste for "Ob-La-Di, Ob-La-Da", writes: "But at least 'Ob-La-Di, Ob-La-Da' had a real melody. 'Wild Honey Pie,' which followed it, simply assaulted the ear; it sounded like someone had taken a hammer to a giant pocket watch until the springs inside collapsed in heavy, discordant agony." Herstgaard says it was "perhaps the most extreme case of self-indulgence on the album". In his contemporary review of the album, Jann Wenner of Rolling Stone wrote a one-sentence summary of "Wild Honey Pie": "[The song] makes a nice tribute to psychedelic music and allied forms."

In 2003, Stylus Magazine ranked "Wild Honey Pie" at number 1 on its list of the "Top Ten Filler Tracks" and described the song as "the greatest piece of filler to ever clutter an over-ambitious double album". They praised the "painfully discordant guitar" and felt the song to be "[o]ne of the most famous half-songs in history." A "Playing God" piece by the same magazine from the following year, in which the author creates a personalised version of the track listing, included the song as the album's opening track, saying "instead of [an] acclimation track like 'Back in the USSR', sound-wise at least, this version of The White Album utilizes the sproing guitar and yarbled vocals of 'Wild Honey Pie' as its opening salvo. It's meant here to let the listener know that this is going to be like no Beatles album they've ever heard." Coinciding with the 50th anniversary of the White Album's release, Jacob Stolworthy of The Independent listed "Wild Honey Pie" in last place in his ranking of the album's 30 tracks, and commented: "Thankfully one of The Beatles' shortest songs."

Personnel
According to author Ian MacDonald:

Paul McCartney – lead and backing vocals, acoustic guitars, bass drum, other percussion

Notes

References

External links 
 

The Beatles songs
Experimental pop songs
1968 songs
Song recordings produced by George Martin
Songs written by Lennon–McCartney
Pixies (band) songs
Songs published by Northern Songs
Psychedelic folk songs